Fatal Ignorance is an EP by Sphere Lazza, released in 1993 by Majestic Records.

Track listing

Personnel 
Adapted from the Fatal Ignorance liner notes.

Sphere Lazza
 Tony Spaz – instruments
 David Trousdale – vocals, instruments

Release history

References

External links 
 Fatal Ignorance at Discogs (list of releases)

1993 EPs
Sphere Lazza albums